Edward Michael Moran (29 November 1876 – 11 February 1918) was an  Australian rules footballer who played with Geelong in the Victorian Football League (VFL).

Notes

External links 

1876 births
1918 deaths
Australian rules footballers from Victoria (Australia)
Geelong Football Club players